The 1545 siege of Ryūgasaki was one of many battles fought by Takeda Shingen in his bid to control Shinano Province during Japan's Sengoku period. The fortress was a satellite castle of Fukuyo, and was held by Tozawa retainer Yoshinaga Mitoyoshi. Yoshinaga himself was killed in battle while the fortress fell.

References
Turnbull, Stephen (1998). 'The Samurai Sourcebook'. London: Cassell & Co. p211

Ryugasaki 1545
Ryugasaki 1545
1545 in Japan
Conflicts in 1545
Ryūgasaki